Higurashi When They Cry is a sound novel later adapted into various anime series, manga, light novels and films. Each characters mostly appear in every arc, including Keiichi Maebara, along with his female friends, Rena Ryugu, Mion and Shion Sonozaki, Satoko Hojo and Rika Furude. The supporting characters also appear in some arcs, including the soon-to-be-retired detective Kuraudo Ooishi, freelance photographer Jiro Tomitake, female nurse and counter-intelligence force leader Miyo Takano, and the clinic's head doctor Kyosuke Irie. The manga characters also appear in the first adaptation. In Onisarashi-hen, Natsumi Kimiyoshi is the visitor of Okinomiya. In Yoigoshi-hen, Akira Otobe appears around in the forest near the deserted village.

Higurashi no Naku Koro ni

Main

Played by: Gōki Maeda (film), Yu Inaba (TV series)
The main male protagonist of the first three "question" arcs. The son of a famous artist, his family recently moved to Hinamizawa after a violent incident event involving him in their hometown. His charisma and remarkable talent for rhetoric, which earns him the nickname "Magician of Words," allow him to easily make new friends and become popular in the village, not to mention winning some club activities. Early in the story, in the Onikakushi-hen arc, he is affected by paranoia after hearing about a dam mutilation murder case and Oyashiro's curse which driven him to murder Rena and Mion who are trying to help him and dies  from clawing his own neck inside a phone booth, but the inner strength and unshaken belief in his friends he acquires in the other arcs are one of the keys to solve the case. Eventually, he is even able to recall some of the events of the past repetitions. Before fighting, he wields Satoshi's old baseball bat. It is later revealed in the story that before arriving there, he grew weary of school, due to his ostracism from having a genius level intelligence, and was the perpetrator of a series of crimes involving shooting children with a BB gun to cope with his immense stress which ended after he accidentally shot a young girl in an eye.

Played by: Aika (film), Hinata Honma (TV series)
One of Keiichi's friends and the main protagonist of both the fourth and final "question" arc and all the "answer" arcs, as well as the ultimately true main protagonist of the entire series. She is in the same grade level as Satoko and they live together in the same house. She is revered by the villagers as the heir of the local shrine, and plays the role of a miko in the annual Watanagashi Festival. She becomes the head of her house surpassing her parents, but rarely attends town meetings at a young age. She also likes to describe events using sound effects, such as "The cat was going 'nya nya' and 'scritch scritch'" or saying "Clap! Clap! Clap!" when clapping her hands. In reality, she is being reborn in a 'new world' at some random time before or during June 1983, and in most of the worlds she is the only one to remember the previous lives. She believes she has lived over 100 years by the time of Tsumihoroboshi-hen, but continues to act like a child in order not to alarm her friends. Prior to Matsuribayashi-hen, she befriends Hanyū beyond her imagination. Despite her young age, she sometimes drinks wine and eats kimchi to try silencing Hanyū. Their connections eventually linked together, though it seems to be redundant by Matsuribayashi-hen, possibly because of Hanyū's arrival. It is later revealed that Rika's death would cause an outbreak in the village which everyone would go on a rampage of hysteria. Further on, she reasons with Takano.

Played by: Airi Matsuyama (film), Minami Kato (TV series)
One of Keiichi's friends and the main female protagonist of the first three "question" arcs. She is very kind and takes care of her friends, but is also naïve and usually subject to light teasing. She is distinguished by her obsession with things she perceives as adorable, calling them , which are usually moekko characters or items she finds while scouring the local dump. Whenever she sees something that grabs her attention, she proclaims  and proceeds to try and do so, becoming virtually unstoppable during these intervals. She also utters the phrase  when excited or flustered, and has a habit of repeating phrases at the ends of her sentences, most famously . She was born in Hinamizawa under her real name, which was used normally while living with her parents until they moved to Ibaraki Prefecture because of her mother's career until a year before the events of the story. It's revealed in Tsumihoroboshi-hen that she's resentful towards her mother, Reiko when the latter was revealed to be in an adulterous relationship with Akihito, her co-worker who got her pregnant with the man's child and made a decision to divorce her father and start a new family with him, Reiko proposed Reina to join her which she angrily rejected. Reiko left her for good causing her to have a mental breakdown followed by her breaking many windows and assaulting three male students with a baseball bat at her local school and attempting to slit both her wrists under the influence of the Hinamizawa syndrome. Believing herself to be cursed by Oyashiro for leaving Hinamizawa, Reina and her father returned to the village after the incident, and changed her name to "Rena" because the letter 'i' in Reina represents 'icky' things that she swore not to remind her of. So as not to alarm Keiichi about the incident, Rena claims to be a relative newcomer of the village. Due to the incident, Rena is sensitive about the topic of Oyashiro, believing strongly in the existence of the deity and the curse, and becoming angry and unstable whenever anyone questions it. She wields a large machete borrowed from her tool shed.

Played by: Rin Asuka (film), Rika Nakai (TV series)
One of Keiichi's friend's, Shion's identical twin sister and the leader of the after-school club. Her social skills are on par with Keiichi, whom she highly respects as a friend and rival (though it is later shown that she is in love with him). She acts like a tomboy, and calls herself oji-san (meaning old man), but has a hidden girlish side. She is next in line to be the head of the Sonozaki household, one of the Three Families holding tremendous influences. She is often seen with a holstered airsoft gun, even though she does not use. It was removed in the PS2 adaption of the game, but she's well-adept in the use of martial arts as shown in Minagoroshi-hen. She is notable as the only character that has never been driven to the extreme paranoia that causes the others to kill in the question arcs and the first two answer arcs. Her real name is actually Shion, as she was born second to the family, but due to the sisters who chose to swap together during their childhood to experience their different side of life, she was mistakenly taken as Mion and branded with the oni tattoo, ultimately causing her to stay as Mion. She organizes a variety of strategy-based games for the members to play with penalties for any losers. Penalties usually involve wearing embarrassing or frilly outfits on the way home. Each game she organizes involves bending the general rules or using questionable and crude methods to win such as playing cards with a marked deck or using feminine wiles to discourage opposition.

Played by: Rin Asuka (film), Rika Nakai (TV series)
Mion's identical twin sister living in Okinomiya. In spite of their externally different personalities, they often switch places and it can be difficult to distinguish between them. It is noted by Rena that, although externally the twins are very different on the inside, they are really the same. Their first switch took place when they were little. Right before tattooing the symbol of a demon, the sisters swapped their roles together to live their own lifes as one another with the real Mion becoming Shion while the real Shion became Mion who later has her entire back tattooed to denote her as the Sonozaki heir which was only mentioned in the sound novel and manga. A year before the storyline shown in Meakashi chapter, Shion abandons St. Lucia Academy that her grandmother, Oryu sent her to as she strongly dislikes her own boarding school and returns to the village. In spite of it, she and Mion maintain a close relationship and helped each other. She later meets Satoshi who she develops an instant liking to him after he rescue her from the delinquents after accidentally angering them. In most of the arcs, she is at a different school from the other characters, and therefore appears less frequently. Shion blames the Three Families for Satoshi's disappearance in Watanagashi-hen and Meakashi-hen (the latter told from her point of view). In the sound novel, manga and anime, when Oryu became aware of Shion living in Okinomiya and exposing her true identity, she was summoned to the main house and forced to perform a "Distinction of Right and Wrong," a ritual of self-mutilation to pluck out three fingernails in front of witnesses in order to purge her 'sins'; first with Kasai, her close bodyguard for assisting her to escape the school, second with Yoshirou, one of her uncles who's also her employer for the Angel Mort and third with Satoshi because she was interacting with a family member of the Hōjōs whom the villagers despise for supporting the dam construction in Hinamizawa. Believing that doing so will cause Satoshi to be spared, an event personally overseen by Mion, which drastically strains their relationship. This, along with a demonic alter-ego she manifested in her grief, eventually drives her to mass murder, which led her previously latent paranoid schizophrenia to eventually develop into a full-on psychosis. One of the last words that they exchanged before he disappeared was a promise to take care of Satoko. In Watanagashi-hen and, more explicitly, Meakashi-hen, her resentment toward Satoko for her role in his disappearance causes her to forget this promise and murder her in cold blood. In Meakashi-hen, she inadvertently blames her family and friends for Satoshi's disappearance. But in Minagoroshi-hen, Upon remembering Satoshi's promises in this world. She exhibits strong love and protection for Satoko as her older sister figure. She works as a waitress at the Angel-Mort Cafe and is the manager's assistant for the Hinamizawa Fighters little league team. Shion wears a yellow ribbon in her hair, and wields a taser for emergency situations and guns in Matsuribayashi-hen.

Played by: Erena Ono (film), Reina Seiji (TV series)
One of Keiichi's best friends, Satoshi's younger sister, and Teppei and Tamae's niece. She has a distinctive style of speech, ending all of her sentences with ~wa, and is known for her boastful laugh. In spite of her young age, she temporarily has an impressive strength, sometimes lure them with traps and likes to practice on Keiichi. Although her personality is quite energetic and mischievous during the events of the games, her past was full of trauma. In Matsuribayashi-hen, Irie learns that Satoko accidentally shoved her parents from the cliff to their deaths below the river. Satoko suffers with the syndrome at that time and though Takano wanted to dissect her alive for study, Irie fought to save her life. She is one of the few characters to ever recover from the fifth level, but has to take shots on a regular basis. She dislikes kabocha, and confuses cauliflower with broccoli.

The mysterious "transfer student" in Matsuribayashi-hen. She has a pair of dark-colored horns on her head, one of which is chipped slightly. In the original sound novels, they are mentioned by Keiichi, who mistook them for toys, but after noticing that Hanyū was sensitive about them, he apologizes and the club members assure her there is nothing wrong with them. However in the anime, nobody notices or mentions them, except Takano calling her a "monster". She has appeared to Rika all her life, but only in Matsuribayashi-hen and Miotsukushi-hen did she gain the power to interact with others, posing as a distant relative of Rika's and given the name "Hanyū Furude." Like many of the characters, she can be frightening when angered, and with her spirit-like nature, her appearance can change with her mood until she takes a physical form. She is the one responsible for the eternally repeating June 1983, which she created in order to save Rika. She is also responsible for the "footstep you hear after you stop walking," "feeling of being watched as you sleep," and hearing "I'm sorry" when no one is around or says it, which causes the characters to have severe paranoia. She follows around the characters, repeatedly apologizing for not being able to change their fate. She is very meek and often makes the noise "Au au, au au…" when she is nervous or uncomfortable, or sometimes while trying to make a point. She dislikes alcohol and kimchi, which Rika imbibes in large amounts as punishment when she finds Hanyu annoying (as Hanyu and Rika's senses are linked together until Hanyū takes physical form). She mentions that she is a "being above humans" after being sacrificed to atone for the sin of humans, while both Rika and Takano describe her as a kind of deity. Rika refers to her as "Oyashiro" when talking with others (evident from Shion's chat with Rika in Meakashi-hen) but does not personally think of her as Oyashiro; instead, she sees her as a close friend. In Higurashi no Naku Koro ni Rei, Hanyū tells Rika that she was sacrificed to atone for the sins of the people of the village, and Hanyū asked  (Hanyū's own daughter and Rika's ancestor, who appears physically almost identical to Rika) to kill her and then make the village a better place.

Secondary

Satoko's older brother, and Teppei and Tamae's nephew. He disappeared a year before Keiichi moves to Hinamizawa. In some arcs, he's mentioned a lot throughout the story as it's revealed that he had 'transferred' which isn't elaborated on but it turns out right before that, he also displayed signs of paranoia and aggression. He and Satoko cannot distinguish the differences between cauliflower and broccoli as they are both colorblind. He is referred to by her as nii-nii, a childish form of the Japanese word . According to the TIPS in Meakashi-hen, he boards the Shinkansen bound from Nagoya to Tokyo. It was revealed before Matsuribayashi-hen to be a result of him trying to abandon his home as his protection for Satoko from Tamae; taking the latter's harsh abuse meant for her became mentally overwhelming for him, he contemplates abandoning Satoko to free himself from this burden but he changes his mind a few moments later. In the sound novel, manga, and anime series, in Meakashi-hen, Shion falls in love with him after he saved her from delinquents attempting to beat her up. When he kills Tamae on the night of the festival, despite Shion's effort to cover for his alibi by lying to Ooishi who suspected him. Combined with the stress of taking care of Satoko and the murder, he succumbs to the terminal level of the Hinamizawa Syndrome. In Matsuribayashi-hen and Miotsukushi-hen. it is revealed that Irie put him under heavy sedation in the underground parts of his clinic as it's revealed that right after picking Satoshi up after the latter purchased a teddy bear for Satoko's birthday. Inside his car, he confessed to Irie about murdering Tamae while also claiming he saw many people resembling Tamae and attempting to claw his throat which Irie realized he's at Level 5 of the syndrome, and took him to his clinic to restrain and treat him. Irie confides Satoshi's true whereabouts only to Shion so that she can visit him many times in hopes that he will one day wake up and reunite with Shion and Satoko.

The village's tutelary deity, also known as Oyashiro-sama. Her sacred shrine is full of ancient torture equipment. Legend says that the curse brought peace between the villagers of Onigafuchi (Lit. Demon's abyss), the former name of the village, and the demons spouting from the Onigafuchi Marsh. Her actual existence is something of debate, some can see her as the simple "perception" of a god. However, those who experience extreme paranoia refer to her as the "footsteps you hear when you stop walking" and felt like you were always "being watched". She turns out to be Hanyū, since some of the characters can hear her until Matsuribayashi-hen.

Played by: Tetta Sugimoto (film), Shinobu Tsuruta (TV series)
A veteran police investigator learning to solve the case about the murders and avenge the first victim who he was friends with. Due to his uncouth tactics and the lengths that he goes to in order to solve the mystery, he is looked upon as a nuisance by the villagers, especially the Sonozaki family. He approaches one of the main characters to become his informant in several arcs, and is sometimes unwittingly responsible for triggering their paranoia. However, he plays an integral role in aiding the protagonists during the last two answer arcs, Matsuribayashi-hen and Minagoroshi-hen.

Played by: Masashi Taniguchi (film), Yuma Ishigaki (TV series)
A freelance photographer who occasionally visits the village three times every year. He gets along with Miyo Takano, because of their similar interests in photography. Despite being an occasional visitor, he seems to know a fair amount about the past (specifically the Hinamizawa murders). Ooishi and the police are suspicious of his true identity. In the first six arcs, he commits suicide by clawing his throat out after the festival, triggering many different events. However in Minagoroshi-hen, Takano was actually the one responsible for his horrific death by giving the H173 drug injection for him, produced in the process of developing a cure for the Hinamizawa Syndrome, but has the exact opposite effect. Jirō is revealed in Minagoroshi-hen to be an SDF officer working as an auditor on the syndrome, together with Takano and Irie, but merely posing as a photographer. Takano had him killed in previous arcs because upon realizing Takano's real scheme to research the syndrome, he will have to terminate the research project out of moral obligations for the villager's and even Takano's wellbeing.

Played by: Ayako Kawahara (film), Rie Kitahara (TV series)
A nurse at the village clinic who takes a keen interest in Hinamizawa's past and culture, recording all her speculation in notebooks. At times, her storytelling can be very mysterious and chilling, she seems to enjoy putting people on edge. In the first six arcs, she consistently disappears on the night of festival, and an incinerated body thought to be hers is found in the mountains (and the autopsy report states that she actually died the day before the festival). In Minagoroshi-hen, Miyo reveals to be the main villain of the series who killed Rika by disemboweling her, leaving her body and scattered organs out for the crows to eat like in Tatarigoroshi-hen. It is shown in her backstory in Matsuribayashi-hen that after her parents died, Takano was sent to an orphanage as a child, where she and other children were regularly abused but they attempt to escape. Takano is rescued by her foster grandfather Doctor Hifumi. In the manga, they further detail what happens to her and her friends when they try to run away. She calls Hifumi, but is caught and she is forced to watch her friends undergo strange types of torture. They try to torture her, but Hifumi saves her. He teaches the path of medicine to her about the syndrome. Her gratitude to her adoptive grandfather is what motivates her to kill Rika, as the scientific community mocked Hifumi's work on parasites, and the release of the infestation would vindicate his research.

 
Played by: Koutaro Tanaka (film), Tomohiro Kaku (TV series)
The head doctor of the clinic. Despite his young age and the fact that he has a severe maid fetish, he is highly respected in the community. He cheerfully makes house calls and seems to truly care about everyone's health. He has (half-jokingly) admitted that he wishes to marry Satoko when she is older, but is not above chasing after Rika when she wears one of the uniforms from Angel Mort Cafe. In addition, he is the manager of the village's baseball little league team, the Hinamizawa Fighters. In the past, he has performed lobotomies without consent, which led to him being banished from the medical academic society in Tokyo. He is recruited by Takano to direct research the syndrome, which he feels will redeem himself. It is later revealed that he works for Miyo, where he tries to find a cure against the syndrome, unknown to the others. In "Outbreak", he fails to create the cure when each of the soldiers monitoring Rika at the clinic contracted the syndrome dying in the process, losing hope, he immediately kills himself as Rika watches on.

Played by: Hitomi Miwa
Keiichi's school teacher and a parody character of Tsukihime's Ciel (permission for her usage was given by Type-Moon). The voice actress for her character in the anime series is the same as the voice actress of Ciel. Like her, she enjoys curry rice, and she will react violently when anyone insults it. Also in the comic chapter Batsukoishi-hen, she wields six small wooden boards like Ciel's "Black Keys" swords.

The main character in Himatsubushi-hen and a police investigator at the Metropolitan Police Department in Tokyo. When he was assigned to Hinamizawa five years ago, He befriends Rika while investigating a case regarding an abducted child named Toshiki Inukai, the grandson of a construction minister who organized the village dam's construction, he learns about a prophecy about his wife's death at the hospital which came true, though he just brushed it off as coincidence. In an untold world, Mamoru regrets being unable to save his wife and Rika, and learns martial arts to clear his mind, hoping to relive the time before Himatsubushi-hen to save them. Through a miracle, In Matsuribayashi-hen, Mamoru subconsciously learns martial art skills to defeat Takano's group and save Rika as gratitude for saving his wife and daughter through her prophecy.

The secret agent of the Sonozaki family and Shion's caretaker. He was more active in the past when he was close to Akane as her bodyguard and had a crush on her even if her husband is his boss but has settled down after he was badly injured in a Yakuza battle. He is also aware of their lifestyles and badgering tactics. In Matsuribayashi-hen, he displays extreme strength and combat experience while raiding the Irie Clinic, frequently subduing Takano's group.

Played by: Hiroo Ōtaka (film), Tomohiro Waki (TV series)
Satoko and Satoshi's abusive uncle, Tamae's husband, and Ritsuko's boyfriend living in Okinomiya. He and Tamae were forced to take care of their nephew and niece after their parents died. The couple had multiple arguments over their financial issues wanting to gain access to a huge load of money that Satoko and Satoshi's parents hid inside their house while venting their anger on the children. Teppei then left Hinamizawa to be with his mistress, Rina leaving Tamae alone with the kids. The next year, depending on Rina's life, if she's killed by the Yakuzas implied to be from the Sonozaki family in Tatarigoroshi-hen or Minagoroshi-hen. Teppei will return to Hinamizawa to hide from them and force Satoko to be his servant, abusing her if she doesn't obey. He is killed twice by Keiichi in Tatarigoroshi-hen and Tsukiotoshi-hen and Rena in Tsumihoroboshi-hen. In Minagoroshi-hen, Teppei is arrested by the police as Keiichi and the residents of Hinamizawa and Okinomiya rallies together to save Satoko from him.

Satoko and Satoshi's villainous aunt, and Teppei's wife. Being paranoid as she's a member of the Hojo family who earned the scorn from residents of Hinamizawa along with discovering Teppei has a mistress, they viciously argue with each other which they also took it out on the children causing them overwhelming misery and stress. She was found bludgeoned in the face to death in the woods during the festival in 1982. In "Onikakushi-hen" and "Watanagashi-hen", she was stated to been killed by a drug addict, which was actually a false statement organised by the Yamainu on Irie's request and it's hinted in Tatarigoroshi-hen that Satoshi was the one who masterminded and murdered her to protect Satoko which is confirmed in Meakashi-hen.

Mion and Shion's grandmother, and the head of the Sonozaki household. Oryō appears to be a very harsh old woman and is considered the most powerful person in Hinamizawa. While she treats Mion kindly as she's the future head of the Sonozaki family but it's the opposite for Shion and she always refers to her as 'Oni-baba', meaning 'demon granny'. She had the twins separated when they were young, in order to try to avoid the curse of twin heirs as the curse actually meant misfortune for the family and it's traditional for one of them to be killed after they are born to quell the curse and Oryo couldn't bear to do it. Shion suspects that she was the mastermind in Satoshi's disappearance, and accidentally kills her while attempting to interrogate her in Watanagashi-hen and Meakashi-hen. Although she appears to be somewhat of a tyrant, she occasionally shows her softer side such as agreeing to rescue Satoko, when Keiichi stood up to her and is only harsh to keep appearances. She respects him after this and later described him as an interesting young man in Minagoroshi-hen (but warns him that he will be chased around with a sword if he shows up again).

Head of one of the Three Families and the official village chief of Hinamizawa. He seems to be a kindly old man, but is vehement in his hatred for those who oppose the villagers. As it includes the rest of the Hojo family even Satoshi and Satoko, he is killed by Shion in Watanagashi-hen and Meakashi-hen.

 The girlfriend of Rena's father and Teppei, also known as by her real name, "Ritsuko". She is first seen when her mutilated body was found flowing down a storm drain in Tatarigoroshi-hen. She reappears in Tsumihoroboshi-hen killed by Rena to protect her father when she discovers that Ritsuko and Teppei are machinating a plan to extort him by violent means and In Minagoroshi-hen, the members of the yakuza stop her from leaving Okinomiya with a whole bunch of cash notes she's taking killing her off-screen. In Miotsukushi-hen, Takano kills Rina after the latter sneak into Irie's clinic and attempt to rob the entire place.

Mion and Shion's mother, Oryō's daughter, and the leader of the Sonozaki household. She attends the council meeting with Oryō and obeys her commands, despite the fact that she lost the inheritance of the family estate for marrying an outsider.

The leader of the Yamainu mercenary working for Takano. They plan to destroy Hinamizawa, but the group betrays her.

A mysterious woman who represents "Tokyo"; an organization plotting the whole murder and massacre of Hinamizawa. "Tokyo" members consist of very powerful figures such as governmental and political people. Within the organization, Irie, Takano and Tomitake investigate directly in the village, while "Tokyo" has controlled by the group.

An omni-present being appearing in the universe. She is the writer of the poem about Rika's struggle to escape the fate of June 1983, giving hints about each arc. She likes playing with time and events, as seen in puzzle piece #52 and the end of the second season of the anime, entering an alternate world and stopping Miyoko's parents from dying. Although she claims that she is not Rika, it's implied that she is the collective mentality of the several thousand reincarnations of Rika. The pronunciation of "Frederica" roughly resembles Rika's name in eastern order, and Bernkastel is well known for its wine.

Mamoru's wife who appears in Himatsubushi-hen. In this chapter, she stays in a hospital while she is pregnant and after praying on the hospital's rooftop for her husband's safety while he is in Hinamizawa, as she was coming down back to her room, she fell down the stairs which was covered with faulty tiles and dies, while fortunately their child, Miyuki, survives. In the Minagoroshi-hen, Matsuribayashi-hen and Miotsukushi-hen chapters, however, it is revealed in these alternate timelines that Mamoru returned early after heeding Rika's warning, thus preventing her death.

A very talented baseball player who was first mentioned in Onikakushi-hen, and appears for the first time in Tatarigoroshi-hen. Keiichi who uncovered his perverted side (comparing girls with cute desserts) and advised him to confront it. After this Keiichi becomes his idol and friend. He used to be a player of the Okinomiya Titans baseball team, but later he became a Koshien player for Ōshima High School. In Minagoroshi-hen, he helped to save Satoko from her uncle with all of his comrades from Angel Mort.

A high school student at St. Lucia Academy, an all girls school. One day, she saw a teacher's dead body in a swimming pool. A lot of the students in her class says that she is always alone and does not open up to anybody. Yukari, the class rep, always seem to bully her like in the first chapter she takes her notebook, only to have Shion steal it and give it back to Mizuho. She later develops a friendship with Shion. It is revealed in Chapter 3 of Utsutsukowashi-hen that she was about to be killed by her grandmother when she was very young, just like Shion.

A younger classmate at the Hinamizawa Branch School, and best friend of Tomita Daiki. He is in the same year as Satoko and Rika. His appearance differs in the Higurashi media. He is sometimes shown to be chubby, and other times he's not. Also he is sometimes shown with closed eyes. In Watanagashi-hen, it was revealed that he has a crush on Rika. He and Tomita like to watch the club members after school, hoping to see Rika and Satoko in a cosplay punishment. He and Tomita play baseball for the Hinamizawa Fighters.

Suguru's best friend. He is in the same year as Satoko and Rika. His appearance is somewhat different in the Higurashi media, but he is always shown to be thin and wear glasses. It is revealed in "Watanagashi-hen" that he has a crush on Satoko, and he often stays after school, hoping to see her in a cosplay punishment during Club activities. He and Okamura both play baseball for the Hinamizawa Fighters.

One of Miyoko's roommates and closest friend at the orphanage. It's unknown how she came to the institute, however it can also be assumed that she lost her parents like the others due to the war or some other incident. At some point, she arranged with Miyoko and a few other children to escape from the orphanage and get to a much better one called the House of Love. They tried to escape and despite Miyoko getting the furthest, all of them were caught and punished for their attempt. Eriko was sent to the chicken coop where she was violently pecked to death by the chickens and had her eyes gouged out, much to Miyoko's horror. Eriko's fate is not revealed in the anime, as it is assumed that she might have escaped.

An elementary school aged boy and the son of the dam construction manager. In episode 15, he is kidnapped by some anonymous guys working for the Sonozaki family in an effort to stop production of the dam. Akasaka and Ooishi fail to rescue Inukai. The terms were accepted with the boy as ransom, but luckily he returned home safely.

The principal of the Hinamizawa Branch School. He helps the officers save Satoko from Teppei. During a scene in Onikakushi-hen, it is revealed that he is ashamed of his bald head. He traveled all over the world to become a martial arts master. He also became an educator, after being concerned about the corrupted educational system of post-war Japan. The students believe he is the reason why no delinquents attend the school.

Manga

Onisarashi-hen

A normal high school girl who's originally from Okinomiya but moved to Kakiuchi, a large city. With her bright personality, she easily made new friends in her new home. She has received a confession of love by Akira Toudou, whom she likes in return. However, she has not answered it yet. She has shrugged off the beliefs and culture of her ancestral home at Hinamizawa, as well as the warnings from her overly-superstitious grandmother, whom she lives with. After Hinamizawa's "disaster", Natsumi's greatest fear is being discovered as being related to people from Hinamizawa and once living near there, in Okinomiya.  She makes a cameo appearance in Miotsukushi-hen when she attends the Watanagashi festival meeting Keiichi and the others except Satoko who's at the Irie Clinic undergoing treatment.

Ooishi consistently attempts to make contact with Natsumi to find out the truth about a certain "unsolved mystery".

As an elite career investigator from the Metropolitan Police Department in Tokyo, he and Ooishi solve a certain mystery.

A cheerful and friendly classmate of Natsumi and Tamako. In "Onisarashi-hen" and "Someutsushi-hen", she introduces Natsumi to Akira when the former first started high school after moving to Kakiuchi from Okinomiya. In "Someutsushi-hen" she fails to get together with Akira after he chooses Natsumi over her which she feels devastated but eventually respects their relationship. While she really cares for Natsumi's wellbeing, she has a bad habit of making insensitive statements mostly regarding Natsumi's heritage by comparing her own benefits of her home city which is superior to Natsumi's countryside side which causes her to become upset quickly and Tamako has to admonish her about it. It's later revealed in Kageboushi-hen that the reason why she's strongly affectionate towards Natsumi is that the latter reminds her of Kaori, her deceased younger sister who had died from an illness that requires a bone marrow transplant to treat it. Chisato was a potential donor for it but she contemplates it when she discussed with her father who's a director for the private hospital, the Saeki General Hospital and had to see Kaori passed away from it in front of her.

A classmate of Natsumi and Chisato. Unlike Chisato, Tamako is a bit silent, calm, sensitive but also an outgoing girl. She and Chisato were childhood friends along with Tōdō Akira. Later on, she befriends Natsumi and helps her out whenever Chisato jokes with her. Just like everybody else at her school, she also treats the Hinamizawan people as "freaks" after the Great Hinamizawa Disaster which puts stress on Natsumi and makes her a victim of the Hinamizawa Syndrome but unbeknownst to Natsumi, if she had confided her origins to Tamako and Chisato, they will forgive her as they are close friends after all. After Natsumi ends up in a hospital she visits her regularly along with Chisato and helps to forget the death of her family.

A male classmate of Natsumi, Chisato and Tamako who has a talent for painting as he's in an art club. Although a silent and introverted young man, Akira's popular among his classmates, he opens up and confesses his love for Natsumi. When Akasaka and Ooishi question her, he goes to pick her up and walks her to her house. Upon arriving, talismans are placed all over the house, and Akira leaves. When Natsumi says that she is not related to the village, he is the only one who sticks up for her. He has a conversation with Ooishi and Akasaka regarding Natsumi's relationship with the village and curse. After his conversation, he calls Natsumi's house from a nearby payphone and hears someone cry for help. When he reaches the Kimiyoshi residence, he looks for Natsumi. However, as soon as he finds her, Natsumi's mother Haruko smashes a vase on his head and knocks him out but in reality; it was actually Natsumi who knocked him out as it turns out it was her hallucination and was her own family's murderer because she was under the influence of the syndrome. After the Kimiyoshi family incident, he forgives Natsumi for lying to him about her relationship with Hinamizawa.

Natsumi's mother and Toji's wife. She first appears as a kind and sociable mother who later becomes the antagonist of Onisarashi-hen as she begins to act physically and emotionally abusive towards Natsumi when she becomes exasperated by her mother, Aki's abnormal chanting to Oyashiro-sama and also aware that Natsumi was working part-time at Saeki General Hospital without the school's permission which is shown only in Someutsushi-hen. One day, after arriving home from school, Natsumi saw her grandmother being stabbed by Haruko to death in the bathroom. Haruko suggests cutting her into small pieces, so they can hide her corpse better. Later, when the body is found by the police (this is advertised on the TV news), Haruko scolds her husband, Touji for hiding it improperly after he admits it. After Haruko left the room, he told Natsumi to call the police, but Haruko overheard this, returned and stabbed him to death with a fruit knife, and decided she must kill Natsumi as well. Akira calls Natsumi's home and hears her screaming for help. When he arrives, Haruko knocks him out with a vase to the head, but is then killed by Natsumi. It is later revealed that this whole event was all a delusion brought on by trauma, and that Natsumi was actually the one who killed everyone, and Haruko is presumed innocent.

Natsumi's father and Haruko's husband. He's an easygoing and silent person and mostly seen reading a newspaper. Because of his job, he had to move from Okinomiya along with his family. In Onisarashi-hen he helps Natsumi hide her grandmother, Aki's chopped up corpse in the Gifu prefecture mountain area, but because of his moral conscience and courage, he deliberately leaves Aki's decapitated head right next to the open road, and the police find it quickly. After the head was found, he suggests Natsumi to turn herself in but since she's at the last stage of the Hinamizawa Syndrome, she's infuriated and kills him with a fruit knife.

Yoigoshi-hen

 
A young man who wanders through the forest of the deserted Hinamizawa. He bears a strong resemblance to Satoshi which surprise Mion when they first met. It is revealed that he came to the deserted village to commit suicide with several others using the method of Charcoal-burning suicide after accumulating a large debt he made as he was studying in Tokyo as a college student to impress his new friends and girlfriend, but he ended up not being able to go through with it and was planned to pay off his debt by stealing a credit card and bank book off a fellow passenger until Mion discovers and reveals his dishonest actions to everyone. Fortunately, due to Mion's stern lecture and summoning one of his deceased friends to talk to him, he decides to atone for himself by giving back her two items, helping Mion who was actually Shion being possessed by the real Mion's spirit to retrieve the Sonozaki family's heirloom, a small golden bell from Mifune, the scheming renegade member of the Sonozaki at the risk of his life and turn himself in afterward after parting with Shion.

As a woman claiming to have been in the village ever since the disaster. She is eventually revealed to be Shion, possessed by Mion who had died in the explosion of the school caused by Rena along with Satoko, Rika, and many children 23 years earlier. She arrived in Hinamizawa in search of an item, her family's heirloom that will prove her right to be the next head of the Sonozaki family. As Mion protects everyone she meets at the Furude shrine assembly hall from the Yakuza members coming to dispose of every one of them, she, Akira, and Arakawa work together to find the heirloom but as they set foot into the Sonozaki household, Mion ends up fatally shot by one of Mifune's henchmen who's also her deceased mother's assassin and kills him in retaliation but since it is Mion's spirit now possessing her sister's body, she magically heals her, promises her that they will reborn together as twins once again before leaving her body permanently so that Shion will live on as an heir to the Sonozaki family.

A tabloid reporter who travels to Hinamizawa to write the occult article about it accompanied by Miyuki only in the console adaptation when its lockdown ended in the present day. It's revealed that his real reason is to discover his estranged father's death as a journalist when he was investigating the Great Hinamizawa Disaster which ended with him interviewing Keiichi who became mentally ill after surviving the school's explosion who cursed him to die 12 years later in the boating accident according to the cassette tape-recorded by him that Arakawa listened to.

A young woman who visits Hinamizawa with her boyfriend, Takumi whom she met in college and fell in love after the lockdown ends. She and Takumi stay in the Furude Shrine assembly hall for the night and the lights attract the attention of the others, causing them all to meet. Though Takumi is believed to still be alive and just sleeping at this point, he is actually already dead.  The group eventually realizes that she is the one who killed Takumi, having finally grown tired of his constant abuse of her. When she hears his plans to fix their relationship and his sorrow over how he treated her, she falls into a state of despair and chooses to stay behind with his body. The group leaves her with a gun, and it seems she might commit suicide. In the end, she instead chooses to come to Otobe's rescue with the gun. She plans to turn herself in once they leave the village, and start her life over again.

Takumi visits Hinamizawa with his girlfriend, Yae, at her urging. He and Yae first met in college and fell in love with each other. After graduating and living together, Takumi, a genuinely kind man pursued his music career as a guitarist in a band that Yae respects and appreciates but soon his career eventually disintegrated when all of his team members chose to settle down for family life and stable jobs and as a result, struggling to write music and failing, he grew bitter, depressive and resorted to drinking alcohol to cope which then he physically abuses Yae multiple times whenever he gets drunk or upset about minor things. After he is found murdered, it is discovered that he was remorseful for his treatment of Yae and planned to fix things once they returned from Hinamizawa as revealed by Mion summoning his spirit as the medium.

Mifune is the antagonist of Yoigoshi-hen. Mifune is a renegade member of the Sonozaki family who was the confidant for Akane Sonozaki's husband. He was the one who organized her assassination by ordering a sniper which failed but she later died after being hospitalized shortly before the events occurs. He had her assassinated so that he will find the Sonozaki's heirloom, a gold ornate bell before Mion, the true heir to have the head position for himself. He and his henchmen kill Mion as she, Akira and Arakawa are cornered by them inside the Sonozaki household but because it was Mion's spirit possessing Shion's body only Mion heals Shion's body to revive her before she left her body and Shion ultimately kills Mifune after he was about to gun down Akira who finally found the heirloom.

Himatsubushi-hen

Mamoru's daughter who is rescued after Yukie's accident. It is said that she is seven years old, and so far she is the only character to have her age said outright. Mamoru sees a resemblance to the approximately five-year-old Rika in her. She, like any child, is very energetic. She is shy, which is shown when she meets Ooishi. She always addresses her father as "Papa", and is frequently shown worrying about him. She only appears in the Himatsubushi-hen manga epilogue and in Higurashi Kizuna Sō, although there is a picture of her in the anime when Akasaka shows it to Ooishi. She may be named after her mother. A teenage Miyuki is one of the protagonists of the 2020 smartphone game Higurashi When They Cry Mei.

Kizuna

Kagebōshi-hen

A new chief inspector and Madoka's older sister based in the fictional city of Kakiuchi, Aichi Prefecture investigating the strange occurrences involving former residents of Hinamizawa killing anyone even their own families and committing suicides in Japan. She became a detective to find their parent's murderer who was an arsonist who burnt down the Minai household in 1971, killing only their parents except Tomoe and Madoka who were the only survivors back then.  Her deceased father, Yusuke was also a dedicated police officer and close friend with her superior, Yamaoki.

Tomoe's younger sister and also a police officer like her. Unlike Tomoe who projects a serious and no-nonsense attitude, Madoka is cheerful and easygoing. She developed pyrophobia after a traumatic incident in 1971 where their parents died in their household fire by an unknown arsonist with Tomoe and Madoka, the only survivors which stills exists now as shown in Tokihogushi-hen as they are leaving a restaurant after dining there to get back to Madoka's car, they both nearly died when the car suddenly explodes in front of them which upon seeing the flames, she screams in terror. She's also Yamaoki's fiancee despite Tomoe's fury over their relationship but eventually respects them.

The member of Kakiuchi Police Department as a detective and Tomoe's colleague and close friend.

A 57-year-old police chief, whom Tomoe, Shingo, and Madoka work for as their superior. He and Madoka are in a romantic relationship and engaged to each other as fiances despite their thirty-years age gap which infuriates Tomoe who's opposed to this unnatural relationship but eventually relents and accepts them. Yamaoki knew the Minai siblings since their childhood as one of his fellow colleague, the sibling's deceased father, Yusuke was his close friend and stills miss him.

Yoigoshi-hen

A freelance writer set on unraveling the mysteries of Hinamizawa with Ryūnosuke. It turns out that she's actually Miyuki Akasaka, Mamoru's daughter as an adult (Sorimachi is her married name.) and is actually an undercover police officer who was assigned to hunt down Mifune, the renegade member of the Sonozaki family and his underlings to arrest them after the failed assassination of Akane Sonozaki who later died in hospital.

Kotohogushi-hen

One of Rika's ancestors and the heir and the Shinto Priest of the Furude House. He was found as a baby by Hanyū in a house fire after a battle with demons in his deceased mother's arms and was given to the villagers to raise him and met him once again as an adult twenty years later. Riku marries Hanyū, and have a daughter, Ōka. He was the reason that he nicknamed "Hainiryuun" because he had a hard time trying to remember and pronounce her name that he shorten it Hanyu.

Hanyu and Riku's daughter resembling Rika. Hanyu requests to be killed by her in order to atone for the villager's sins, which she does.

The head of the Kimiyoshi Family, and Natsumi and Kiichiro's ancestor. She becomes Hanyū's friend, despite that Shino have seen her horns, though she is not alarmed at it.

The head of the Sonozaki family and the ancestor of Oryō, Akane, Mion and Shion. She and Shino apparently did not get along with each other.

Miotsukushi-hen

Shirō was mentioned in Kagebōshi-hen, but appeared in DS render of Tokihogushi-hen Miotsukushi-hen. He happens to be a former colleague of Shingo.

The elderly patient of the retirement center of Saeki General Hospital, where Natsumi works part-time. A non-talkative person, Natsumi develops a bond with him when he mentions Hinamizawa, a town where her grandmother also once lived before she joins Natsumi's family to live together in Kakiuchi city, however, he and his family were mysteriously killed; In Someutsushi-hen, when the Great Hinamizawa Disaster occurred, he develops Level 5 of Hinamizawa Syndrome and murdered Yamase, Natsumi's mentor and employer by bludgeoning her to death with a fire extinguisher before committing suicide by stabbing his own neck with a knife. In Kageboushi-hen, he was stabbed to death by his good friend, Kiyoshi Obata who also once lived in Okinomiya like Hatekayama, Obata also commits suicide by stabbing his own throat with a knife he used to kill Hatakeyama.

Kazuma's ten-year-old granddaughter who is mentioned in Someutushi-hen and made a major role in Kageboushi-hen. In Someutsushi-hen, she was murdered by her father, Masao who also killed his wife, Yoshiko and his youngest son, Kentarou by he attempted to kill himself but was found by police and was implied to be taken to hospital for treatment and recovery. In Kageboushi-hen, she's the only surviving member of the Hatakeyama family when Masao also commits murder-suicide just like he did with his wife and son except for Aoi with a hunting rifle and she's kept under police monitoring at the Saeki General Hospital. But when Tomoe investigates more into the crime scene, she discovers that Aoi was actually the true murderer of her entire family as she was capable of arming the hunting rifle because Masao had already taught her how to operate it on several hunting trips, when she had the mental breakdown, she murders them in cold blood. When Natsumi was also admitted to the same hospital as the former after murdering all of her family members which also cause her traumatic amnesia, Aoi encounters her by chance and tells her that the latter was the one who murdered her parents just like Aoi did. This cause Natsumi's memories to come back and also her other personality to resurface who suggests to hunt Chisato down for attempting to take Akira away from her.

Hō

Kamikashimashi-hen

She is first introduced trying to rescue Keichi and the other club members from a deranged mob in Okinomiya in the midst of an outbreak of the Hinamizawa Syndrome following the events of Higurashi Outbreak. She first presents herself as a normal human girl; however, it is later revealed that she is a godly entity similar to Hanyū.

Another godly entity like Hanyū, she has certain type of paranormal connection with Miyo Takano, which is similar to Hanyū's relationship with Rika.

Gou
Characters first introduced in 

 A mysterious woman introduced in Satokowashi-hen who grants Satoko the power to travel between fragments. She wears a shrine maiden's outfit similar to Hanyū, carries a khakkhara, and has a crescent-shaped device resembling horns floating around her head. Condescending and sardonic, Eua gives Satoko her powers on the condition that Satoko will keep her entertained. After claiming that she does not have a name, she is given the name "Eua" by Satoko. She bears a strong resemblance to Featherine Augustus Aurora from Umineko When They Cry.

Meguri

In an alternate reality, she is a new transfer student to Hinamizawa, where her grandparents live, and befriends Keiichi and the rest of the school club. Prior to the Watanagashi Festival, she is invited by Takano and Tomitake to enter the Saiguden or Ritual Storehouse, where she becomes particularly interested in a naginata; this subsequently becomes her signature weapon.
In 2022, Miyabi was also introduced as a character in Higurashi Mei.

Mei

The main protagonist of Mei, she is the granddaughter of Kiichiro Kimiyoshi. She is the only member in her family who survived the 1983 Great Hinamizawa Disaster, and lives in a dormitory supported by distant relatives. In 1993 she visits Hinamizawa after the lockdown is lifted, where she meets Tamura Hime no Mikoto, who grants her the ability to time travel to 1983.

Nao is a Tokyo native who visits Hinamizawa initially for undisclosed reasons. It is later revealed that she is in fact Rena Ryugu's half-sister. After Rena's parents divorced, Rena's mother married a man named Akihito Hotani and had Nao with him shortly after the Great Hinamizawa Disaster.

Kawata is a freelance journalist who came to Hinamizawa to do research and write a book.

Miyuki Akasaka's friend, whom she knows because her father was a police officer who worked with Mamoru Akasaka.

References

External links
Manga official website 
Anime official website 

Characters
Lists of anime and manga characters